Casimiro de Abreu may refer to:

 Casimiro de Abreu, a Brazilian writer and poet.
 Casimiro de Abreu, Rio de Janeiro, a Brazilian municipality.
 Casimiro de Abreu Esporte Clube, a Brazilian football club.